Kuzbass  (sometimes spelled Kuzbas) is short for Kuznetsk Basin. It may refer to:
 Kuznetsk Basin
 Kuzbass Region, another name for the Kemerovo Oblast
 Kuzbass Autonomous Industrial Colony
 Metallurg-Kuzbass, a Russian football club from Novokuznetsk
 KUZBASS Kemerovo, a Russian football club from Kemerovo
 Kuzbass Kemerovo Bandy Club, a Russian bandy club